Marjaavaan is a 2019 Hindi language romantic action film written and directed by Milap Milan Zaveri and produced by T-Series and Emmay Entertainment. Marjaavaan stars Riteish Deshmukh, Sidharth Malhotra, Rakul Preet Singh and Tara Sutaria. It was described by co-producer Bhushan Kumar as a masala and dramatic love story. The film received mixed reviews from critics and was commercially 'below average' at the box office.

The music album of Marjaavaan was released under T-Series and its songs became one of the biggest chartbusters with "Tum Hi Aana", "Thodi Jagah" and "Peeyu Datt Ke", and the item number "Ek Toh Kam Zindagani" garnering charts. It was distributed by Pen Entertainment in India and Eros International in overseas.

Plot

Raghu is a loyal goon to the local thug Narayan Anna who controls the water mafia in Mumbai. Anna's dependence on Raghu doesn't sit well with Vishnu, Anna's son, whose complexes arise from more than just his short stature, as he is only three feet tall. When Raghu falls for Zoya, a mute musically inclined Kashmiri girl who teaches children music, Vishnu jumps at the opportunity to use it to discredit his father's most favourite goon.

Vishnu kid Zoya had selected for her music festival to shoot him. Zoya sees this and flees, but Vishnu is already alerted of her presence. Vishnu tells Anna that there was an eyewitness to Gaitonde's murder, and that witness is Zoya, so Anna orders Raghu to kill Zoya, not knowing that Raghu loves her. Raghu finds Zoya and tries to run away from Vishnu and Anna, but Vishnu catches them and orders Raghu, Zoya, and all the kids to be killed. Anna tells Raghu he and the kids will be safe if he kills only Zoya, as she is the eyewitness to Gaitonde's murder. Zoya tells Raghu to kill her so that he and the kids remain safe. Zoya gives Raghu the gun, places her thumb over his, pulls the trigger, and dies in his arms.

The police arrest a traumatized Raghu for Zoya's murder; in jail, Raghu becomes depressed and broken. The children and Raghu's friends help bury Zoya. Vishnu tries to get Raghu killed in jail, knowing if he is released, he will take revenge. However, Raghu beats up the goons Vishnu hired. Vishnu then attacks and cuts off Raghu's friend Mazhar's leg because Mazar kicked him. When Anna tells him that Raghu will be sentenced to life, Vishnu helps Raghu get out by bribing the proofs, planning to kill Raghu upon his release.  However, when Raghu returns, Vishnu sees that Raghu is not the same after Zoya's death. Anna tells him that Raghu died the day he killed Zoya. Vishnu tries various ways to bring Raghu back to his old ways but fails. Raghu had completely changed, and all his old habits had changed. Anna catches him and warns him against this, but Vishnu angrily kills Anna and sends goons to kill Raghu. However, Raghu kills them all and buries them. He visits Zoya's grave and vows revenge on Vishnu; his friends join him in this mission.

On the day of Dussera, when Vishnu comes to burn Ravana's idol, Raghu arrives and starts beating all the goons. Vishnu pierces an arrow into Raghu's heart, but Raghu tosses him into the ground and burns him. While dying, Raghu sees Zoya's soul and dies peacefully, surrounded by friends and family. The police arrive, and the inspector tells the Assistant Commissioner of Police, Ravi Yadav that Raghu died. The ACP replies that Raghu returned to his life, which was with Zoya.

Cast 
Riteish Deshmukh as Vishnu Shetty Narayan Anna's son the main antagonist                           
Sidharth Malhotra as Raghuvendra "Raghu" Nath, Zoya And Aarzoo's love interest and the main protagonist 
Rakul Preet Singh as Aarzoo Hussain, Payal's sister and Raghu's friend who falls in love with him
Tara Sutaria as Zoya Ahmed, Raghu's love interest
Nassar as Narayan Shetty aka Narayan Anna, Vishnu's father
Shaad Randhawa as Mazhar, Raghu's best friend
Ravi Kishan as ACP Ravi Yadav
Om Kanojiya as Timepass
Anant Jog as Gaitonde, Narayan Anna's enemy
Amit Mehra as Gaitonde's son
Varinder Singh Ghuman as Rakka
Bikramjeet Kanwarpal as Prison Fighter
Godaan Kumar as Shafi, Raghu's best friend
Uday Nene as Gopi, Raghu's best friend
Alina Kazi as Payal Hussain, Aarzoo's sister
Swati Seth as Zarika, Zoya's friend
Nora Fatehi in a special appearance in the song "Ek Toh Kum Zindagani"
Nushrat Bharucha in a special appearance in the song "Peeyu Datt Ke"

Production

Filming 
Principal photography of the film began on 7 December 2018 with Malhotra sharing his picture on his official Instagram account.
The second schedule is set to roll in from mid-January and will end by March 2019. Sidharth Malhotra is shooting with a dozen goons and has switched to action mode. "The stunt team wanted to shoot with a body double because Sidharth's back and shoulder would be on fire but he was adamant on doing the scene himself to make it look authentic and stay true to his character". Siddharth wrapped up his portion except for songs on 15 March 2019. He announced the news by posting a picture with crews with a heartfelt message. In November 2019, Deshmukh revealed that Shah Rukh Khan had helped the production team with some VFX shots for the former's role as a dwarf.

Marketing and release 
The official poster of the film was shared by Sidharth Malhotra on 30 October 2018, announcing the release date of 8 November 2019. On 5 August 2019, Malhotra announced that the film is delayed to avoid the clash with Siddharth Anand's big budget film  War starring Tiger Shroff and Hrithik Roshan, but the release date was not  confirmed. On 23 August 2019, the first poster was unveiled by Malhotra, giving the new release date of 8 November 2019. On 3 September, a second poster was unveiled, in which it was shown that the release date of the film is advanced to 8 November. on 10 October, he announced new release date of film is 15 November 2019.

The film was released on 15 November 2019 after the release date was advanced by a week to accommodate the release of Bala.

Reception
The film received mixed reviews from critics.

Bollywood Hungama have it a rating of 3.5/5 and wrote, "The Sidharth Malhotra Tara Sutaria starrer MARJAAVAAN is a true blue masala entertainer that has the potential to impress its target audience". Khaleej Times rated the film 1.5 stars out of 5 and said, "'Marjaavan' falls several shades short of a proper Bollywood masala entertainer that it aspires to in spite of having all the ingredients for it. The weak and clichéd plotline along with heavy-duty dialogues that should have impressed but end up sounding hollow is only part of the problem."

The Times of India rated the film 2.5 stars out of 5 and reviewed, "Marjaavaan attempts to check all the boxes for an emotional action rollercoaster, but its dated execution doesn't quite make the kill."

Mumbai Mirror rated the film 2 on 5 stars and said, "This Sidharth Malthotra, Riteish Deshmukh and Tara Sutaria-starrer is a tedious watch."

Scroll.in rated the film 2 out of 5 stars and wrote, "A 1980s Bollywood flashback with characters who are cardboard cutouts."

Box office
Marjaavaans opening day domestic collection was 7.03 crore. On the second day, the film collected 7.21 crore. On the third day, the film collected 10.18 crore, taking the total opening weekend collection to 24.42 crore.

, with a gross of 56.88 crore in India and 8.46 crore overseas, the film has a worldwide gross collection of 65.34 crore.

Soundtrack 

This music of film is composed by Tanishk Bagchi, Meet Bros, Payal Dev, Yo Yo Honey Singh, Aditya Dev and Sanjoy Chowdhury with lyrics written by Kumaar, Tanishk Bagchi, Kunaal Vermaa, Manoj Muntashir, A. M. Turaz, Rashmi Virag, Prasoon Joshi, Yo Yo Honey Singh, Dope Leo and Mujtaba Aziz Naza.

The second song, "Ek Toh Kum Zindagani", is a remake of the song "Pyar Do Pyar Lo" from the film Janbaaz, being the second remake of the song after Anees Bazmee's Thank You, where it was composed by Pritam.

The fourth song Haiya Ho, is a remake of "Chahe Meri Jaan Tu Le Le", a song from Dayavan.

Two songs of the film which were removed from the final cut were released later as singles as they didn't go well with the narrative of the film. They were the song "Peeyu Datt Ke", starring Nushrat Bharucha which was released on 2 December 2019 and the song Masakali 2.0 which is a recreated version of the song "Masakali" from the 2009 film Delhi-6 and was released on 8 April 2020 by T-Series.

Kinna Sona, a Pakistani song originally sung by the Pakistani qawwal Nusrat Fateh Ali Khan, was covered by Pakistani singer Atif Aslam for the film's soundtrack. In February 2019 the All Indian Cine Workers Association levied a ban on all Pakistani artists, hence the track was replaced at the last minute by a version sung by the Indian singer Jubin Nautiyal. Although the song remained a cover of the Pakistani Qawwali. In June 2020 T-Series released the initial cover sung by Atif Aslam on YouTube, however were forced to remove it and issue an 'apology' after a threat-laced campaign led by the far-right Indian nationalist party: Maharashtra Navnirman Sena.

References

External links 

2019 films
Films scored by Sanjoy Chowdhury
Films scored by Tanishk Bagchi
Films scored by Meet Bros
Films scored by Payal Dev
Films scored by Yo Yo Honey Singh
2010s Hindi-language films
Indian romantic action films
Indian films about revenge
2010s masala films
T-Series (company) films
Films about deaf people
Films about rape in India
Films about terrorism in India
Works about dwarfism
2010s vigilante films
Indian vigilante films
Films directed by Milap Zaveri